The following is a list of notable deaths in January 2014.

Entries for each day are listed alphabetically by surname. A typical entry lists information in the following sequence:
Name, age, country of citizenship and reason for notability, established cause of death, reference.

January 2014

1
Peter Austin, 92, British brewer (Ringwood Brewery).
Bobbi Jean Baker, 49, American transgender activist and minister, car crash.
George Deas Brown, 91, Australian politician.
Traian T. Coșovei, 59, Romanian poet.
Pierre Cullaz, 78, French jazz guitarist and cellist.
Herman Pieter de Boer, 85, Dutch writer, lyricist and journalist.
Pete DeCoursey, 52, American political journalist, pancreatic and lung cancer.
Michael Glennon, 69, Australian Roman Catholic priest and convicted child molester.
James H. Harless, 94, American industrialist and philanthropist.
Higashifushimi Kunihide, 103, Japanese Buddhist monk.
Milan Horvat, 94, Croatian conductor.
Jamal al-Jamal, 56, Palestinian diplomat, Ambassador to the Czech Republic (since 2013), injuries sustained in an explosion.
Jorge Jottar, 84, Chilean Olympic skeet shooter, heart attack.
Billy McColl, 62, Scottish actor (Doctor Who).
William Mgimwa, 63, Tanzanian politician, MP (since 2010), Minister of Finance (since 2012).
Therese Mills, 85, Trinidad journalist and editor.
Juanita Moore, 99, American actress (Imitation of Life, Disney's The Kid, Two Moon Junction).
Jafar Namdar, 79, Iranian Olympic and World Cup football referee.
Dean Nyquist, 78, American politician and lawyer.
Josep Seguer, 90, Spanish footballer.
Cal Swenson, 65, Canadian ice hockey player (Winnipeg Jets).
Tabby Thomas, 84, American blues musician.
Sam Ulano, 93, American drummer.
Tokuo Yamashita, 94, Japanese politician, Minister of Health, Labour, and Welfare.

2
Terry Biddlecombe, 72, English National Hunt jockey.
Jeanne Brabants, 93, Belgian dancer, choreographer and teacher.
Terry Magaoa Chapman, 69, Niuean civil servant.
Des Dans, 89, Australian trade unionist and politician.
Anne Dorte of Rosenborg, 66, Danish countess, respiratory illness.
Louis George, 63, Saint Lucian politician, Minister of Education (1982–1997).
Bernard Glasser, 89, American film producer (Return of the Fly, The Day of the Triffids).
Patrick Heron, 61, Irish author, cancer.
Elizabeth Jane Howard, 90, English novelist.
R. Crosby Kemper, Jr., 86, American banker and civic philanthropist.
Thomas Kurzhals, 60, German composer and musician (Stern-Combo Meißen, Karat), liver cirrhosis.
Li Tai-hsiang, 72, Taiwanese composer and folk songwriter, multiple organ failure.
Ian Mackley, 71, British diplomat, High Commissioner to Ghana (1996–2000).
Dhananjay Mahato, 94, Indian politician.
Franciszek Malinowski, 82, Polish scholar and journalist.
Michael J. Matthews, 79, American politician and convicted criminal, Mayor of Atlantic City, New Jersey (1982–1984).
Yōko Mitsui, 78, Japanese poet, liver failure.
Hal Newton, 80, Canadian football player (Calgary Stampeders).
Harald Nugiseks, 92, Estonian war veteran and anti-communism activist.
*Oiteyama Hirokuni, 75, Japanese sumo wrestler.
Dirk Sager, 73, German journalist.
Arnold A. Saltzman, 97, American businessman and diplomat.
Viktor Talyanov, 79, Soviet Olympic skier.
Jay Traynor, 70, American singer (Jay and the Americans), liver cancer.

3
Larry Arndt, 50, American baseball player (Oakland Athletics).
Guillermo Arriaga Fernández, 87, Mexican dancer, composer and choreographer, pneumonia.
Eric Barnes, 76, English footballer (Crewe Alexandra).
Sylvia Bassot, 73, French politician, member of the National Assembly (1996–2012).
Albert Calland, 84, English footballer.
Carlos Manuel de Céspedes y García-Menocal, 77, Cuban theologian and writer.
Leon de Wolff, 65, Dutch journalist and media consultant, multiple system atrophy.
Robert Diligent, 89, French journalist.
Phil Everly, 74, American Hall of Fame singer and musician (The Everly Brothers), chronic obstructive pulmonary disease.
Donald Forst, 81, American newspaper editor, cancer.
John M. Freeman, 80, American pediatric neurologist.
George Goodman, 83, American economics commentator, myelofibrosis.
László Helyey, 65, Hungarian actor.
Sir Michael Neubert, 80, British politician, MP for Romford (1974–1997).
Alicia Rhett, 98, American actress (Gone with the Wind) and portrait painter.
Jennie Robak, 81, American politician, Nebraska State Senator (1989–2003), traffic collision.
Wilson Allen Shoffner, 75, American soldier.
George Wilson, 93, Australian rules footballer.
Larry Vognild, 81, American politician, Washington State Senator (1978–1994), heart failure.
David Whitefield, 77, South African cricketer.
Yashiki Takajin, 64, Japanese singer-songwriter and television presenter, esophageal cancer.
Saul Zaentz, 92, American film producer (One Flew over the Cuckoo's Nest, The English Patient, Amadeus), Oscar winner (1976, 1985, 1997), Alzheimer's disease.

4
Bill Abington, 92, American politician, member of the Texas House of Representatives (1949–1953).
Ahmad A'zam, 64, Uzbek writer.
Caixa Eletronica, 9, American racehorse, training collision.
Mrinal Das, 66, Indian trade unionist, heart attack.
Irving Fishman, 92, American politician, member of the Massachusetts House of Representatives (1963–1968), Senator (1971–1974).
Gabe Gabler, 83, American baseball player (Chicago Cubs).
Andy Holden, 65, English Olympic long distance runner (1972).
Shirley Jeffrey, 74, Australian marine biologist.
Chris Karras, 89, American painter.
Sergey Kozlov, 53, Russian football player and coach.
Jean Metellus, 76, Haitian poet and writer.
Josef Staribacher, 92, Austrian politician, pneumonia.

5
Martin Behrmann, 83, German choirmaster and university teacher.
M'hamed Benguettaf, 75, Algerian actor and playwright.
Philippe Boiry, 86, French pretender to the throne of the Kingdom of Araucania and Patagonia.
Jerry Coleman, 89, American baseball player, manager and broadcaster (Yankees, Padres) and Marine aviator, complications from brain bleeding and surgery.
C. Durairaj, Indian politician.
Eusébio, 71, Portuguese footballer, top goalscorer at the 1966 World Cup, heart failure.
Arthur Gietzelt, 93, Australian politician, Senator for New South Wales (1971–1989), Minister for Veterans' Affairs (1983–1987).
Augusto Graziani, 80, Italian economist.
Slamet Gundono, 47, Indonesian puppeteer.
Brian Hart, 77, British racing driver and engineer.
Simon Hoggart, 67, English journalist, pancreatic cancer.
Govert Huijser, 82, Dutch general, Chief of the Defence Staff (1983–1988).
Annamária Kinde, 57, Romanian poet, journalist and editor.
Uday Kiran, 33, Indian film actor, suicide by hanging.
János Kristófi, 88, Romanian painter.
E. J. Lowe, 63, British philosopher.
Alma Muriel, 62, Mexican actress, heart attack.
Nelson Ned, 66, Brazilian singer, pneumonia.
Mogens E. Pedersen, 85, Danish journalist (Se og Hør).
Tom Quinn, 79, American actor (The Wire, Super 8, The Next Three Days), diabetes.
Peter Rull Sr., 91, Hong Kong Olympic sport shooter.
Rod Searle, 93, American politician, member of the Minnesota House of Representatives (1957–1981), Speaker (1979).
Sissel Sellæg, 85, Norwegian actress.
Endre Senkálszky, 99, Romanian actor and director.
K. P. Udayabhanu, 77, Indian playback singer.
David Maxwell Walker, 93, Scottish lawyer and academic.
Ray Williams, 86, Welsh rugby union player.
Carmen Zapata, 86, American actress (Sister Act, Santa Barbara, Viva Valdez), heart disease.
Mustapha Zitouni, 85, French-Algerian footballer.

6
Jim Appleby, 79, English footballer (Blackburn Rovers).
John Ash, 88, English ornithologist.
Bob Bolen, 87, American politician and businessman, Mayor of Fort Worth, Texas (1982–1991).
Don Chuy, 72, American football player (Los Angeles Rams, Philadelphia Eagles).
Herbert Fries, 88, German Oberfähnrich in the Fallschirmjäger during World War II.
Rashaad Galant, 66, South African cricketer.
Marina Ginestà, 94, French veteran of the Spanish Civil War.
Karel Gut, 86, Czech ice hockey player and manager, member of the International Ice Hockey Federation Hall of Fame.
Aitzaz Hasan, 17, Pakistani schoolboy, intercepted suicide bomber at school, injuries sustained in bombing.
Frank Illiano, 86, American criminal (Genovese crime family), infection.
Larry D. Mann, 91, Canadian-born American actor (Gunsmoke, Hill Street Blues, Rudolph the Red-Nosed Reindeer).
Pedro Mayorga, 93, Argentine Olympic equestrian and sports official.
Thomas Patrick Melady, 86, American educator and diplomat, Ambassador to Burundi (1969–1972), Uganda (1972–1973) and the Holy See (1989–1993).
Čika Mišo, 82, Bosnian shoeshiner, heart attack.
James Moorhouse, 90, British politician, Member of the European Parliament (1979–1999).
Hector Munro, 93, English cricketer.
Carlos Padilla Velásquez, 79, Honduran football manager.
H. Owen Reed, 103, American composer, conductor and educator.
Bishop Robinson, 86, American police chief, Commissioner of the Baltimore Police Department (1984–1987), Alzheimer's disease.
Julian Rotter, 97, American psychologist.
Lena Smedsaas, 62, Swedish journalist (TV4Nyheterna), cancer.
Mónica Spear, 29, Venezuelan actress and beauty pageant winner (Miss Venezuela 2004), shot.
Don Ward, 78, Canadian ice hockey player (Chicago Black Hawks, Boston Bruins).
Todd Williams, 35, American football player (Tennessee Titans).

7
AKM Nazir Ahmed, 74, Bangladeshi politician.
Jerald C. Anderson, 79, American politician, Minnesota State Senator (1970–1980).
Alvin Aubert, 83, American poet.
Paul Cuneo, 75, Australian rugby league footballer.
Giuseppe Frascarelli, 90, Italian footballer (Ascoli).
Ivan Ladislav Galeta, 66, Croatian multimedia artist.
Paul Goggins, 60, British politician, MP for Wythenshawe and Sale East (since 1997), brain haemorrhage.
Maureen Gray, 65, American songwriter and doo-wop singer, bile duct cancer.
Bakhtiyar Gulamov, 64, Azerbaijani footballer.
Thomas V. Jones, 93, American businessman, CEO of Northrop Corporation (1960–1989), pulmonary fibrosis.
Thomas Knight, 62, American convicted murderer and fugitive, execution by lethal injection.
Willy Köstinger, 73, Austrian Olympic skier (1964).
Peter Moraites, 91, American politician.
Vilard Normcharoen, 51, Thai footballer (Thai Port).
Emiel Pauwels, 95, Belgian athlete.
Phil Ryan, 98, Australian football player and administrator (Hawthorn).
Sir Run Run Shaw, 106, Hong Kong media mogul (Shaw Brothers Studio) and philanthropist.
Sunshine Forever, 29, American racehorse.
Sir Richard Thornton, 81, British landowner and public servant. Lord Lieutenant of Surrey (1986–1997).
Roy Warhurst, 87, English footballer (Birmingham City).

8
Antora, Bangladeshi actress.
Vicente T. Blaz, 85, American USMC general and politician, delegate to the U.S. House of Representatives from Guam (1985–1993).
Vishwanath Bondre, 77, Indian cricketer.
Luis Marcos Bronstein, 67, Argentine chess player.
Charles Casali, 90, Swiss footballer (BSC Young Boys).
Joy Chatel, American cosmetologist, community organizer and activist, respiratory disease.
Angela Clayton, 54-55, British physicist.
Ernie Derr, 92, American stock car racing driver.
Maciej Dunal, 60, Polish actor and singer.
André Gernez, 90, French physician.
Madeline Gins, 72, American poet, painter and architect, cancer.
Irma Heijting-Schuhmacher, 88, Dutch Olympic swimmer (1948, 1952).
Adrian Holmes, 88, Australian Olympic boxer.
Levon Khechoyan, 58, Armenian writer.
Josef Lammerz, 83, German composer and organist.
Jacques Lazarus, 97, Swiss-born French military officer, Jewish resistance leader in France during World War II.
José Luis Martinez, 87, Spanish Olympic sports shooter.
Armen Mazmanyan, 53, Armenian theater director and actor.
Edward N. Ney, 88, American business executive and diplomat, CEO of Young & Rubicam (1970–1986), Ambassador to Canada (1989–1992).
Robert Pastor, 66, American academic and national security advisor, colon cancer.
Antonino P. Roman, 74, Filipino politician, member of the House of Representatives (1998–2007), multiple organ failure.
Selçuk Uluergüven, 73, Turkish actor.

9
Amiri Baraka, 79, American poet, writer and activist, Poet Laureate of New Jersey (2002–2003).
Charlie Bazzano, 90, Australian Olympic cyclist.
Rynn Berry, 68, American vegetarian activist and author, heart attack.
Roy Campbell, Jr., 61, American jazz trumpeter, hypertensive atherosclerotic cardiovascular disease.
Cliff Carpenter, 98, American actor (Synecdoche, New York, Alan Wake, The Daily Show).
Josep Maria Castellet, 87, Spanish writer, publisher and editor.
Bill Conlin, 79, American sports columnist (Philadelphia Daily News).
Lorella De Luca, 73, Italian actress, brain tumour.
Paul du Toit, 48, South African artist, cancer.
Faith Evans, 76, American state legislator.
Luis García, 84, Venezuelan professional baseball player, cerebrovascular disease.
Yuri Golov, 77, Russian footballer.
Patrick J. Hannifin, 90, American naval officer.
Winfried Hassemer, 73, German judge and academic.
Michael Hemmingson, 47, American writer, cardiac arrest.
Chaudhry Aslam Khan, 46-47, Pakistani police chief, bombing.
Salvador Llopis, 63, Spanish footballer.
Hans Lund-Andersen, 92, Norwegian mining engineer and businessperson.
Franklin McCain, 73, American civil rights leader, member of the Greensboro Four.
Albert McCann, 72, English footballer (Portsmouth).
D. Harold McNamara, 90, American astronomer.
Jean-Jacques Moreau, 90, French mathematician.
Dale T. Mortensen, 74, American economist, laureate of the Nobel Prize in Economic Sciences (2010), cancer.
Eric Palante, 50, Belgian motorcycle rally rider, race collision.
Věra Tichánková, 93, Czech actress.
Bill Woodhouse, 77, American sprinter.
Marc Yor, 64, French mathematician.

10
Joel Barkan, 72, American political scientist, pulmonary embolism.
Sam Berns, 17, American high school student, progeria sufferer and documentary subject (Life According to Sam), progeria.
Ike Borsavage, 89, American basketball player.
Elliot Eisner, 80, American academic.
Kathryn Findlay, 60, British architect, brain tumour.
Aram Gharabekian, 58, Armenian conductor.
Anthony J. Hederman, 92, Irish judge, Attorney General (1977–1981).
Petr Hlaváček, 63, Czech academic and shoe expert.
Frouwke Laning-Boersema, 76, Dutch politician, member of the House of Representatives (1982–1994).
Margo Maeckelberghe, 81, British artist.
Marly Marley, 75, Brazilian vedette and actress, pancreatic cancer.
Jean-Claude Roger Mbede, 34, Cameroonian prisoner, imprisoned for homosexuality.
Zbigniew Messner, 84, Polish politician, Prime Minister of the People's Republic of Poland (1985–1988).
Donald Morton, 79, American oncologist, heart failure.
Salvatore Nicolosi, 91, Italian Roman Catholic prelate, Bishop of Lipari (1963–1970) and Noto (1970–1998).
Ian Redford, 53, Scottish footballer (Rangers, Ipswich Town, Dundee).
Larry Speakes, 74, American journalist, de facto White House Press Secretary (1981–1987), Alzheimer's disease.
Hadi Thayeb, 91, Indonesian diplomat, co-founder of the Ministry of Foreign Affairs, Minister of Industry (1964–1966), Governor of Aceh (1981–1986).
Jack Tuell, 90, American Methodist minister and equal-rights advocate, Bishop of Los Angeles (1980–1992).
Allard van der Scheer, 85, Dutch actor.

11
Zainul Abedin, 69, Bangladeshi politician.
Georgia Allen, 94, American actress.
Keiko Awaji, 80, Japanese actress (Stray Dog, The Bridges at Toko-Ri), esophageal cancer.
Jean Biès, 80-81, French philosopher and author.
David Bird, 55, American journalist, drowned (disappeared on that day).
Jophery Brown, 68, American baseball player (Chicago Cubs) and stuntman (Die Hard, Predator, Oblivion), complications from cancer.
Chai Trong-rong, 78, Taiwanese politician, stroke.
Walter Currie, 91, Canadian educator.
Zoltán Pál Dienes, 97, Hungarian mathematician and educationalist.
Bryan Fairfax, 88, Australian conductor.
Arnoldo Foà, 97, Italian actor, voice actor and director, respiratory failure.
Vugar Gashimov, 27, Azerbaijani chess player, complications from a brain tumour.
Muhammad Habibur Rahman, 85, Bangladeshi judge and jurist, Chief Justice (1995), Chief Advisor (1996).
Michael Jacobs, 61, British writer, cancer.
Joe Junkin, 67, Canadian ice hockey player (Boston Bruins), cancer.
Dick Miller, 55, American basketball player (Utah Jazz), heart attack.
Volodymyr Raskatov, 56, Ukrainian Soviet Olympic silver and bronze medallist swimmer (1976).
Ariel Sharon, 85, Israeli politician and general, Minister of Defense (1981–1983), Prime Minister (2001–2006), heart failure.
Sitaram Singh, 65, Indian politician.
Alphonsus Augustus Sowada, 80, American Roman Catholic prelate, Bishop of Agats (1969–2001).
Stanley Uys, 91, South African journalist, heart attack.
Jerome Willis, 85, British actor (Doctor Who, Space Precinct).
Mora Windt-Martini, 76, Romanian world champion field handball team player (1956).

12
Heinz Angelmaier, 95, German soldier, Hauptmann in World War II, awarded Knight's Cross of the Iron Cross.
Neal Barrett, Jr., 84, American author.
Alexandra Bastedo, 67, British actress (Batman Begins, The Champions) and animal welfare advocate, breast cancer.
Nick Bevan, 71, British rowing coach.
Connie Binsfeld, 89, American politician, Lieutenant Governor of Michigan (1991–1999).
John Button, 70, British racing driver, suspected heart attack.
Halet Çambel, 97, Turkish Olympic fencer (1936) and archaeologist.
George Dement, 91, American innkeeper, restaurateur and politician, Mayor of Bossier City, Louisiana (1989–2005).
François Joseph Pierre Deniau, 77, French Roman Catholic prelate, Bishop of Nevers (1998–2011).
Keith Dyce, 87, British veterinarian.
William Feindel, 95, Canadian neurosurgeon.
Tony Harding, 72, British comics artist.
Ángel Herrero, 71, Spanish footballer, pulmonary edema.
Patrick Horsbrugh, 93, British architecture professor.
John Horsley, 93, British actor (The Fall and Rise of Reginald Perrin, The Box of Delights, You Rang, M'Lord?).
Burton Lifland, 84, American judge, pneumonia.
Frank Marth, 91, American actor (The Honeymooners, Hogan's Heroes), heart failure and Alzheimer's disease.
Robert H. Quinn, 85, American attorney and politician, Speaker of the Massachusetts House of Representatives (1967–1969), President of the NAAG (1974–1975).
Armando Rodriguez, 96, Cuban-born American grocer.
Sir Robert Scholey, 92, British business executive, Chairman of British Steel (1986–1992).
Zdenko Škrabalo, 84, Serbian-born Croatian academician and diplomat, Minister of Foreign and European Affairs (1992–1993).
Michael L. Strang, 84, American politician, member of the U.S. House of Representatives from Colorado (1985–1987).
Tsunetoshi Tanaka, 88, Japanese politician, member of the House of Representatives (1969–1972, 1980–1996).
Gyula Török, 75, Hungarian Olympic champion boxer (1960).

13
Don Asmonga, 85, American basketball player and teacher.
Manibhushan Bhattacharya, 75, Indian poet.
Patricia Boyle, 76, American federal judge, U.S. District Court Justice (1978–1983), Michigan Supreme Court Justice (1983–1998), respiratory failure.
Ulysse Bozonnet, 92, French soldier and Olympic skier (1948).
Bobby Collins, 82, Scottish footballer.
José Daher, 47, Brazilian tennis player, road accident.
Anjali Devi, 86, Indian actress (Lava Kusa, Suvarna Sundari) and film producer.
Mihai Fotino, 83, Romanian actor (Codine).
Gatluak Deng Garang, 59, South Sudanese general and politician, Governor of Upper Nile (2008–2009), cancer.
Gary Grimshaw, 67, American rock concert graphic poster artist.
Amos Hadar, 90, Israeli politician.
Kees IJmkers, 89, Dutch politician, member of the Senate (1966–1967, 1969–1987).
Bruce Jones, 68, American surfboard shaper, heart attack.
Ronny Jordan, 51, English jazz guitarist.
Eric Khoo Heng-Pheng, 57, Malaysian scout leader, heart attack.
Bennie Lands, 92, Canadian Olympic basketball player (1948).
Thomas McCloy, 86, Irish cricketer.
Norm Parker, 72, American college football coach, defensive coordinator of the Iowa Hawkeyes (1999–2011).
Randal Tye Thomas, 35, American politician, Mayor of Gun Barrel City, Texas (2000–2001).
Michael Tshele, 64, South African photographer and community activist, shot.
Waldemar von Gazen, 96, German officer in the Wehrmacht during World War II and Iron Cross recipient.
Menachem Zilberman, 67, Israeli comedian and songwriter, heart attack.

14
Rex Adams, 85, English footballer.
Marian Ewurama Addy, 72, Ghanaian scientist.
Joan Beck, 95, Australian archaeologist and fencer.
Issa Benyamin, 89, Iranian Assyrian calligrapher and educator.
Jon Bing, 69, Norwegian writer and legal scholar.
Alan Blackburn, 78, English footballer.
Erik Blegvad, 90, British illustrator.
Pierre F. Brault, 74, Canadian composer.
Fernand Brosius, 79, Luxembourgian footballer (Spora Luxembourg).
Sir Nicholas Browne, 66, British diplomat, Ambassador to Iran (1999–2002) and Denmark (2003–2006).
Juan Gelman, 83, Argentine poet, winner of the Miguel de Cervantes Prize (2007), myelodysplastic syndrome.
Jerry Marciniak, 76, Canadian football player.
Eric James Mellon, 88, English ceramic artist.
Ole Moe, 95, Norwegian newspaper editor and politician.
Eric Paterson, 84, Canadian Olympic champion ice hockey player (1952).
Bernard Perlin, 95, American painter.
Esther Ann Reeser, 86, American baseball player (Springfield Sallies).
Richard Shepherd, 86, American film producer (Breakfast at Tiffany's), kidney failure.
St Nicholas Abbey, 6, Irish racehorse, euthanised due to complications from colic surgery.
Flavio Testi, 91, Italian composer and musicologist.
Michalis Vardanis, 78, Greek Army officer and lawyer, major figure in the resistance against the military junta.
Mae Young, 90, American Hall of Fame professional wrestler.

15
Mallikarjun Bande, 39, Indian police officer, shot.
Curtis Bray, 43, American football player and coach, pulmonary embolism.
Joan Brickhill, 89, South African actress and producer.
A. Lorne Campbell, 83, Canadian lawyer.
George Chalhoub, 82, Egyptian Olympic basketball player.
Namdeo Dhasal, 64, Indian poet and activist, colon cancer.
Quail Dobbs, 72, American equestrian and clown.
John Dobson, 98, American astronomer.
Don Engel, 84, American lawyer, leukemia.
Marion Faller, 72, American photographer.
José de Jesús García Ayala, 103, Mexican Roman Catholic prelate, Bishop of Campeche (1967–1982).
Elena Gorokhova, 80, Russian painter.
Liam Hogan, 74, Irish hurler.
Karl Hudson-Phillips, 80, Trinidadian judge and politician, Attorney General (1969–1973).
Gennadi Matveyev, 76, Russian football player and manager.
Tor Milde, 61, Norwegian journalist and writer (Verdens Gang).
Reid Patterson, 81, American Olympic swimmer (1956), Georgia Sports Hall of Fame inductee (1984).
Maya Romanoff, 72, American interior designer.
Stanford Tischler, 92, American film editor and producer (M*A*S*H).
Hiroshi Yoshino, 87, Japanese poet, pneumonia.

16
Suleyman Aliyarli, 83, Azerbaijani historian.
Cosimo Antonelli, 87, Italian Olympic water polo player (1956).
Gary Arlington, 75, American author, editor and publisher, key figure in the underground comix movement.
Harvey Bernhard, 89, American film producer (The Goonies, The Omen, The Lost Boys).
Patrick Chabal, 63, British political scientist.
John G. Cleary, 64, New Zealand computer scientist.
Douglas Davis, 80, American art critic and artist.
Ruth Duccini, 95, American actress (The Wizard of Oz).
Russell Johnson, 89, American actor (Gilligan's Island, The Twilight Zone), kidney failure.
Vladimír Krajňák, 86, Slovak Olympic skier.
Roger Lloyd-Pack, 69, English actor (Only Fools and Horses, The Vicar of Dibley, Tinker, Tailor, Soldier, Spy), pancreatic cancer.
Dave Madden, 82, Canadian-born American actor (Laugh In, The Partridge Family, Alice), heart and kidney failure.
Hiroo Onoda, 91, Japanese Imperial Army World War II intelligence officer, did not surrender until 1974.
Bence Rakaczki, 20, Hungarian footballer, leukemia.
José Sulaimán, 82, Mexican boxing official, President of the World Boxing Council (since 1975), International Boxing Hall of Fame inductee (2007).
Hal Sutherland, 84, American animator (Sleeping Beauty, Star Trek: The Animated Series), co-founder of Filmation.
Chris Ullo, 85, American politician, member of the Louisiana House of Representatives (1972–1988) and Senate (1988–2008), heart failure.
Stan Watson, 76, British footballer (Darlington).

17
Martin Barratt, 77, British paediatrician.
Nadia Boudesoque, 97, Mexican actress and Olympic fencer (1948).
Salvador Breglia, 78, Paraguayan football player and coach.
Mohammed Burhanuddin, 98, Indian Islamic spiritual leader, 52nd Da'i al-Mutlaq of the Dawoodi Bohras, heart attack.
Frank Cockett, 97, British surgeon and art historian.
Niels Lauritz Dahl, 87, Norwegian diplomat.
Joe Evans, 97, American jazz alto saxophonist.
Holger Hansson, 86, Swedish Olympic bronze-medalist football player (1952) and coach.
Seizō Katō, 86, Japanese voice actor, bladder cancer.
Saizo Kishimoto, 85, Japanese yakuza (Yamaguchi-gumi).
Francine Lalonde, 73, Canadian politician, MP for Mercier (1993–2004) and La Pointe-de-l'Île (2004–2011), cancer.
Kong Le, 79, Laotian military leader.
James Lockhart, 80, American historian.
Alistair McAlpine, Baron McAlpine of West Green, 71, British businessman, politician and author, Treasurer of the Conservative Party (1975–1990).
John J. McGinty III, 73, American Marine Corps officer, recipient of the Medal of Honor.
Alexandros Petersen, 29, American academic, writer and geopolitical energy specialist, bombing.
Sunanda Pushkar, 49, Indian-born Canadian businesswoman and entrepreneur, drug overdose.
Suchitra Sen, 82, Indian actress (Sharey Chuattor, Harano Sur, Deep Jwele Jaai), heart attack.

18
Kathryn Abbe, 94, American photographer.
Robert A. Alberty, 92, American biophysical chemist.
Tommaso Bisagno, 78, Italian politician, member of the Chamber of Deputies (1979–1994).
W. Robert Blair, 83, American lawyer, businessman and politician, member of the Illinois House of Representatives (1967–1977).
Michael Botmang, 76, Nigerian politician, Governor of Plateau State (2006–2007), kidney disease.
Peadar Clohessy, 80, Irish politician, TD for Limerick East (1981–1982, 1987–1997).
John Joseph Compton, 85, American philosopher.
Herbert Dodkins, 84, English Olympic footballer (1956).
Komla Dumor, 41, Ghanaian journalist and news presenter (BBC World News, Focus on Africa), heart attack.
Obi Egbuna, 82, Nigerian novelist, playwright and political activist.
Jacques Famery, 90, French film actor.
Dennis Frederiksen, 62, American rock singer (Angel, Le Roux, Toto), liver cancer.
Andy Graver, 86, English footballer (Lincoln City).
Takao Iwami, 78, Japanese political pundit, pneumonia.
Trevor Jacobs, 67, English footballer.
Milan Kajkl, 63, Czech Olympic silver-medalist ice hockey player (1976).
Alpo Lintamo, 80, Finnish footballer.
Sarah Marshall, 80, British actress (The Long, Hot Summer, Star Trek, Dave), cancer.
Eugenio Cruz Vargas, 90, Chilean poet and painter.
Frans Vermeyen, 70, Belgian footballer (Lierse, Royal Antwerp), stroke.

19
Azaria Alon, 95, Ukrainian-born Israeli environmentalist.
Pierre Charras, 68, French writer, actor and translator.
Sir Christopher Chataway, 82, British athlete, broadcaster, politician and businessman, MP for Lewisham North (1959–1966) and Chichester (1969–1974), cancer.
Steven Fromholz, 68, American entertainer, singer and songwriter, Poet Laureate of Texas (2007), accidental shooting.
Aslan Gahramanly, 74, Azerbaijani playwright, renal failure.
Gordon Hessler, 88, British film director (Kiss Meets the Phantom of the Park) and screenwriter.
Michał Joachimowski, 63, Polish Olympic triple jumper (1972, 1976).
Tim Jones, 57, Canadian paramedic, cardiac arrest.
Udo Kasemets, 94, Estonian-born Canadian composer.
Al Lerner, 94, American pianist and composer.
Erik Nord, 95, Norwegian politician.
Michael Sporn, 67, American film animator, pancreatic cancer.
Ben Starr, 92, American television producer and writer (The Brady Bunch, All in the Family, The Facts of Life).
Stanley Jeyaraja Tambiah, 85, Sri Lankan anthropologist.
Bert Williams, 93, English footballer (Wolverhampton Wanderers, national team).

20
Claudio Abbado, 80, Italian conductor.
Wistin Abela, 80, Maltese politician, Deputy Prime Minister (1981–1983), Finance Minister (1983–1987).
Tom Bender, 69, Australian basketball player.
Vern Benson, 89, American baseball player (St. Louis Cardinals) and manager (Atlanta Braves).
Win Borden, 70, American politician, Minnesota State Senator (1971–1978).
Ubaldo Continiello, 72, Italian film composer.
Graeme Dallow, 84, New Zealand police officer.
Lance E. Davis, 85, American economic historian.
Armen Hovhannisyan, 19, Armenian Nagorno-Karabakh soldier, shot.
Kiyoharu Ishiwata, 73, Japanese politician, member of the House of Councillors (1989–2001), heart failure.
James Jacks, 66, American film producer (The Mummy, Mallrats, Dazed and Confused), heart attack.
José Isabel Jiménez, 98, Mexican baseball journalist.
Jumber Lominadze, 83, Georgian physicist.
John Mackey, 96, Irish-born New Zealand Roman Catholic prelate, Bishop of Auckland (1974–1983).
Hans Meuer, 77, German computer scientist.
Otis G. Pike, 92, American politician, United States Representative from New York (1961–1979).
George Scott, 84, Scottish-born Canadian wrestler, lung cancer.
Pete Titanic, 93, Canadian football player (Toronto Argonauts).
Jonas Trinkūnas, 74, Lithuanian ethnologist and religion folklorist, founder of Romuva.
Michael Vosse, 72, American writer and publicist.

21
Myril Axelrod Bennett, 93, American businesswoman, heart failure.
Dieter Bortfeldt, 72, British graphic designer and philatelist.
G. Thompson Brown, 92, American missionary and theologian.
Tony Crook, 93, English racing driver.
Jocelyn Hay, 86, British broadcasting campaigner.
Tim Hosley, 66, American baseball player (Oakland Athletics).
Solomon Tilewa Johnson, 59, Gambian Anglican prelate, Archbishop of West Africa (since 2012).
Bill Kresse, 80, American cartoonist.
Warren Lamb, 90, British management consultant.
René Maury, 85, French lawyer and economist.
Wilford Moore, 94, American college football coach (McMurry Indians).
Natalie Myburgh, 73, South African Olympic swimmer (1956).
Marcel Ostiguy, 84, Canadian politician.
Tony Pabón, 74, American singer, trumpeter and bandleader.
Joel L. Shin, 45, American lawyer and policy adviser, heart attack.
Dick Shrider, 90, American college basketball coach and athletic director (Miami RedHawks).
Georgi Slavkov, 55, Bulgarian footballer, heart attack.
Rhonda Small, 88, Australian filmmaker.
Graham Stevenson, 58, English cricketer, complications from stroke.
Roar Woldum, 81, Norwegian Olympic swimmer.
George C. Wortley, 87, American politician, United States Representative from New York (1981–1989).

22
Luis Ávalos, 67, Cuban-born American actor (The Electric Company, Stir Crazy, Hollywood Homicide), heart failure.
Arthur Bellamy, 71, English footballer.
Charles A. Berg, 87, American politician.
Martin S. Bergmann, 100, American psychology professor and actor (Crimes and Misdemeanors).
Fred Bertelmann, 88, German singer and actor.
Alice Besseling, 69, Dutch politician.
Patrick Brooking, 76, British army major general.
Saidi Bwanamdogo, 45, Tanzanian politician, MP for Chalinze (since 2010).
Roy Cicala, 74, American record producer and sound engineer.
Chet Curtis, 74, American television anchor, pancreatic cancer.
François Deguelt, 81, French singer.
Robert Domergue, 92, French football player and manager.
Pierre Jalbert, 89, Canadian actor (Combat!) and skier, heart attack.
John Kabaireho, 91, Ugandan politician, Prime Minister of dependent Ankole Kingdom (1960–1963).
Manuel Leguineche, 72, Spanish journalist.
Carlo Mazzacurati, 57, Italian film director.
Serhiy Nigoyan, 20, Ukrainian protester (Euromaidan), shot.
Maziar Partow, 81, Iranian cinematographer, heart disease.
Akkineni Nageswara Rao, 90, Indian actor (Chenchu Lakshmi, Sri Krishnarjuna Yuddham, Premabhishekam) and film producer, Dadasaheb Phalke Award (1990), cancer.
Dhirubhai Thaker, 95, Indian Gujarati writer, multiple ailments.
Wando, 13, Canadian Thoroughbred racehorse, heart attack.

23
Henri Ackermann, 91, Luxembourgian cyclist.
Ted Bottiger, 81, American politician, Washington State Senator (1973–1987), State Representative (1965–1972).
Robert Coldsnow, 89, American politician, member of the Kansas House of Representatives (1965–1970).
Violetta Ferrari, 83, Hungarian actress.
Franz Gabl, 93, Austrian Olympic alpine skier (1948).
Moshe Gil, 92, Israeli historian.
Yuri Izrael, 83, Russian meteorologist.
Khin Yu May, 76, Burmese actress and singer.
Katsuyo Kobayashi, 76, Japanese food critic (Iron Chef), multiple organ failure.
Mille Marković, 52, Yugoslav-born Swedish sex club owner, convicted criminal and boxer, shot.
Uroš Marović, 68, Yugoslav Olympic champion water polo player (1968).
Kazys Morkūnas, 88, Lithuanian stained glass artist.
Lew Massey, 57, American basketball player (Charlotte 49ers).
Ivar Moe, 91, Norwegian lawyer and politician.
Riz Ortolani, 87, Italian film composer.
Charlie Osgood, 87, American baseball player (Brooklyn Dodgers).
Jan Pesman, 82, Dutch Olympic bronze-medalist speed skater (1960).
Eugene Schlickman, 84, American politician, member of the Illinois House of Representatives (1964–1980).
S. Sriskandarajah, 60, Sri Lankan judge and lawyer.
Béla Várady, 60, Hungarian Olympic silver medallist footballer (1972).

24
Shulamit Aloni, 85, Israeli politician, leader of the Meretz party.
Jay S. Amyx, 90, American politician, Mayor of Boise (1966–1974).
Knut Aukland, 84, Norwegian physiologist.
Igor Badamshin, 47, Russian Olympic cross-country skier, heart attack.
Curt Brasket, 81, American chess player.
Lisa Daniely, 84, British actress (The Invisible Man, Doctor Who, The First Churchills).
Abdelkader El Brazi, 49, Moroccan footballer, cancer.
Aguinaldo Fonseca, 91, Cape Verdean poet.
Joseph Kalite, Central African health minister, machete attack.
Sahal Mahfudz, 76, Indonesian spiritual leader (Nahdlatul Ulama).
Boyd Oxlade, 70, Australian author and screenwriter (Death in Brunswick), cancer.
Rafael Pineda Ponce, 83, Honduran educator and politician, President of the National Congress (1998–2002), kidney failure.
Maren-Sofie Røstvig, 93, Norwegian literary historian.

25
Bruce Barmes, 84, American baseball player (Washington Senators).
Marcelino Bilbao Bilbao, 94, Spanish military officer.
Jack Brain, 93, Australian footballer.
David Cairns, 88, English cricketer.
Adelfa Botello Callejo, 90, American lawyer and civil rights activist, brain cancer.
Arthur Doyle, 69, American jazz musician.
Robert F. Goldsworthy, 96, American politician.
Eric Green, South African rear admiral, Flag Officer Fleet (1999–2005), aortic aneurysm.
Heini Halberstam, 88, Czech-born British mathematician.
John R. Huizenga, 92, American physicist, heart failure.
Kurt Krenn, 77, Austrian Roman Catholic prelate, Bishop of Sankt Pölten (1991–2004).
Jacques Meslier, 85, French Olympic water polo player (1960).
Nasser Minachi, 82, Iranian politician.
John Robertson, 79, Canadian journalist.
Milan Ružić, 58, Croatian footballer.
Emanuel Saldaño, 28, Argentine cyclist, national road race champion (2011), traffic collision.
Dave Strack, 90, American basketball player and coach (Michigan Wolverines), pneumonia.
Gyula Sax, 62, Hungarian chess player, heart attack.
Pius Tirkey, 85, Indian politician, MLA for Alipurduars (1977–1996).
Morrie Turner, 90, American cartoonist (Wee Pals).
Dennis Wirgowski, 66, American football player (New England Patriots, Philadelphia Eagles).

26
Laver Bariu, 84, Albanian folk clarinetist and singer.
Stephen Clapp, 74, American violinist and music educator, Dean of the Juilliard School (1994–2007).
Renzo Colzi, 76, French Olympic cyclist (1956).
Ollie Conmy, 74, Irish footballer.
Tom Gola, 81, American basketball player (Philadelphia Warriors) and politician.
Paula Gruden, 92, Australian poet and translator.
Oleg Imrekov, 51, Russian football player and manager.
Paavo Kotila, 86, Finnish Olympic long-distance runner (1956).
Margery Mason, 100, English actress (The Princess Bride, Harry Potter and the Goblet of Fire, Love Actually).
John Farquhar Munro, 79, Scottish politician, MSP for Ross, Skye and Inverness West (1999–2011).
Tom Nyuma, Sierra Leonean politician and military officer.
José Emilio Pacheco, 74, Mexican poet, essayist and novelist, winner of the Miguel de Cervantes Prize (2009), heart attack.
Gino Polidori, 72, American politician, member of the Michigan House of Representatives (2005–2010), prostate cancer.
Miguel Romero, 68–69, Spanish politician and activist, cancer.
Karl Slym, 51, British business executive, Managing Director of Tata Motors (since 2012), self-defenestration.
Patrick D. Smith, 87, American author (A Land Remembered).
Gerald B. Whitham, 86, British applied mathematician.
Rusty York, 78, American musician.
Doris Witiuk, 84, American AAGPBL baseball player (Racine Belles, Battle Creek Belles).

27
Haji Bakr, Iraqi militant (ISIL), shot. (death announced on this date)
Masako Bandō, 55, Japanese novelist, winner of the Naoki Prize (1996), tongue cancer.
Georges Breitman, 93, French Olympic athlete.
Robert F. Burt, 65, American Navy officer, multiple myeloma.
Ann Carter, 77, American child actress (The Curse of the Cat People), ovarian cancer.
Mimi Cazort, 83, Canadian writer and curator.
Stepan Chapman, 63, American author (The Troika).
Edmond Classen, 75, Dutch actor (Flodder 3, Lijmen/Het Been).
Theo Ditzler, 77, Swiss sports shooter.
Brian Gibbs, 77, English footballer and manager.
Mahalingum Govender, 67-68, South African cricketer.
Richard Grossman, 92, American publisher.
Leen Jansen, 83, Dutch Olympic middleweight boxer (1952).
Dinesh Medh, 85-86, Indian cricketer.
Ichirō Nagai, 82, Japanese voice actor (Sazae-san, Space Battleship Yamato), heart attack.
R. A. Padmanabhan, 97, Indian journalist and historian.
Pete Seeger, 94, American folk singer and songwriter ("Turn! Turn! Turn!", "If I Had a Hammer").
Hashem Shabani, 32, Iranian activist, hanging.
Alan Townsend, 92, English cricketer (Warwickshire).
Masaaki Tsukada, 74, Japanese voice actor (Bleach, One Piece).
Epimaco Velasco, 79, Filipino politician, Director of the NBI (1992–1995).
Paul Zorner, 93, German night fighter pilot during World War II.

28
Qasim Akhgar, 62-63, Afghan activist, heart attack.
Justin Back, 18, American student, stabbed.
Bill Boivin, 99, Canadian football player.
John Bothwell, 87, Canadian Anglican bishop.
Frédéric Bruly Bouabré, 91, Ivorian artist.
John Cacavas, 83, American television score composer (Kojak, Hawaii Five-O).
Harry Gamble, 82, American football executive (Philadelphia Eagles) and head coach (Penn Quakers).
Gennady Grushevoy, 63, Belarusian philosopher and politician.
Dwight Gustafson, 83, American composer and conductor.
Pravin Hansraj, 75, Indian cricketer.
Hans Huber, 84, German Olympic ice hockey player.
Nigel Jenkins, 64, Welsh poet, pancreatic cancer.
Herb Kirsh, 84, American politician, member of the South Carolina House of Representatives (1978–2010).
John Kreamcheck, 88, American football player (Chicago Bears).
Sven Kullander, 78, Swedish physicist.
Fernand Leduc, 97, Canadian abstract painter, cancer.
Ted Nealon, 84, Irish journalist and politician, TD for Sligo–Leitrim (1981–1997).
Gudō Wafu Nishijima, 94, Japanese Zen Buddhist priest and teacher.
Jorge Obeid, 66, Argentine politician, Governor of Santa Fe (1995–1999, 2003–2007), pulmonary embolism.
Blas Piñar, 95, Spanish politician, founder of New Force.
Bill Pritchett, 92, Australian public servant, Secretary of the Department of Defence (1979–1984).
Veikko Rantanen, 82, Finnish Olympic wrestler.
Kenneth Rose, 89, British journalist and author.
Kazuhiko Sakazaki, 76, Japanese baseball player (Yomiuri Giants), stomach cancer.
Tom Sherak, 68, American film producer and studio executive, President of AMPAS (2009–2012), prostate cancer.
António Soares Carneiro, 86, Portuguese politician and military officer.
Barry Spacks, 82, American poet.
Sue Wallis, 56, American politician, member of the Wyoming House of Representatives (since 2007).
Stevie Woods, 62, American R&B singer, complications from diabetes.
Renzo Zanazzi, 89, Italian cyclist.

29
Johnny Allen, 96, American music arranger (Shaft), complications from pneumonia.
Rahmanberdi Alyhanow, 28, Turkmen footballer, failed operation.
Ashutosh, 68, Indian religious leader, heart attack.
Biko, 30, American Olympic eventing horse (1996), euthanized.
François Cavanna, 90, French author and satirical newspaper editor.
*Colonel Meow, 2, American Himalayan-Persian cat, Guinness World Record holder for longest fur.
Lars Andreas Larssen, 78, Norwegian actor, Alzheimer's disease.
Zoe MacKinnon, 55, Canadian Olympic field hockey player (1984), cancer.
Jim Mansfield, 74, Irish businessman.
Theodore Millon, 85, American psychologist, heart disease.
Aïché Nana, 77, Turkish showgirl and actress.
Vytautas Norkus, 93, Lithuanian-born American basketball player.
Robert Resnick, 91, American physicist, educator and author.
Jim Rone, 78, British Anglican clergy, Archdeacon of Wisbech (1984–1993).
Ildefonso P. Santos, Jr., 84, Filipino landscape architect, heart failure.
Tarit Kumar Sett, 83, Indian Olympic cyclist (1952).
Jack Stoddard, 87, Canadian ice hockey player (New York Rangers).
Piers Wedgwood, 4th Baron Wedgwood, 59, British aristocrat, cardiac failure.

30
Abdullah Omran Taryam, 65-66, Emirati journalist, stroke.
Jean Babilée, 90, French dancer and choreographer.
Stefan Bałuk, 100, Polish general and photographer.
Krzysztof Birula-Białynicki, 69, Polish Olympic ice hockey player (1972).
John Branthwaite, 86, New Zealand Anglican priest.
John Carty, 63, Irish politician, TD for Mayo (2002–2007), Senator (2007–2011).
Danielle Downey, 33, American golfer and coach, traffic collision.
Greater, c. 83, Australian greater flamingo, world's oldest flamingo, euthanized.
Campbell Lane, 78, Canadian actor (Cool Runnings, The X-Files, Scary Movie 4), lung cancer.
The Mighty Hannibal, 74, American R&B, soul and funk singer, songwriter and record producer.
William Motzing, 77, American-born Australian composer, conductor and arranger.
Marioara Murărescu, 66, Romanian television producer.
Mr Tiz, 29, New Zealand racehorse.
Benedict John Osta, 82, Indian Roman Catholic prelate, Archbishop of Patna (1980–2007).
Jim Parsley, 86, American stock car racing driver.
Cornelius Pasichny, 86, Canadian Ukrainian Catholic hierarch, Bishop of Saskatoon (1996–1998) and Toronto (1998–2003).
Arthur Rankin, Jr., 89, American director, producer and writer, co-founder of Rankin/Bass Productions.
Helmut Röhrl, 86, German mathematician.
Suzanne Scotchmer, 64, American economist, intestinal cancer.
Bishwonath Upadhyaya, 83, Nepalese judge and jurist, Chief Justice (1991–1995), brain haemorrhage.

31
Adegboyega Folaranmi Adedoyin, 91, Nigerian-born British Olympic athlete (1948). (death announced on this date)
Inatio Akaruru, 76, Cook Islands politician.
Nina Andrycz, 101, Polish actress and poet.
Sebastian Barker, 68, British poet, cardiac arrest.
Deborah Blackwell, 63, American cable network executive (SOAPnet) and talent agent, Pick's disease.
Gundi Busch, 78, German world champion and Olympic figure skater.
Emilio Del Giudice, 74, Italian biophysicist.
Bob DePratu, 74, American politician, member of the Montana Senate (1995–2004).
Francis M. Fesmire, 54, American cardiologist and emergency physician.
Mike Flanagan, 85, British-born Israeli soldier.
Anna Gordy Gaye, 92, American songwriter ("Baby, I'm for Real"), co-founder of Anna Records.
Bruce Groves, 66, South African cricketer.
Carsten Hopstock, 89, Norwegian historian.
Jaime Huélamo, 65, Spanish Olympic cyclist (1972).
Abdirizak Haji Hussein, 89, Somali politician, Prime Minister (1964–1967).
Alexander Ivashkin, 65, Russian cellist, cancer.
Miklós Jancsó, 92, Hungarian director and screenwriter.
Joseph Willcox Jenkins, 85, American composer and academic.
Christopher Jones, 72, American actor (The Legend of Jesse James, Ryan's Daughter, The Looking Glass War), cancer.
Hans Methlie Michelsen, 93, Norwegian judge and Holocaust survivor, Attorney General of Norway (1962–1972).
Thomas Montemage, 87, American Olympic cyclist.
Baden Powell, 82, British footballer.
Sir David Price, 89, British politician, MP for Eastleigh (1955–1992).
Mike Reed, 39, American football player (Philadelphia Eagles), cancer.
Kenneth Saggers, 77, South African cricketer.
Giorgio Stracquadanio, 54, Italian politician and journalist, lung cancer.
Kura Strickland, 84, Cook Islands politician.
Wong Choon Wah, 66, Malaysian Olympic footballer (1972).

References

2014-01
 01